Clinocera fontinalis  is a species of fly in the family Empididae. It is found in the  Palearctic.

References

Empididae
Insects described in 1833
Brachyceran flies of Europe